Caddo is a genus of harvestmen in the family Caddidae. There are at least two described species in Caddo.

Species
These two species belong to the genus Caddo:
 Caddo agilis Banks, 1892 i c g b
 Caddo pepperella Shear, 1975 i c g b
Data sources: i = ITIS, c = Catalogue of Life, g = GBIF, b = Bugguide.net

References

Further reading

 
 

Harvestmen
Articles created by Qbugbot
Taxa named by Nathan Banks